Justus Scharowsky (born 13 August 1980) is a field hockey player from Germany, who plays for French club Racing Club de France. The midfielder made his international senior debut for the German team on 10 July 1999 in a friendly against South Korea in Leipzig. As of 12 November 2005, Scharowsky earned 93 caps for his native country, in which he scored fifteen goals.

International senior tournaments
 2002 – Champions Trophy, Cologne (2nd place)
 2003 – Champions Trophy, Amstelveen (6th place)
 2004 – Summer Olympics, Athens (3rd place)
 2005 – European Nations Cup, Leipzig (3rd place)
 2005 – Champions Trophy, Chennai (4th place)
 2006 – Champions Trophy, Terrassa (2nd place)
 2006 – 11th World Cup, Mönchengladbach (1st place)
 2007 – European Nations Cup, Manchester (4th place)
 2007 – Champions Trophy, Kuala Lumpur (1st place)

References

External links
 

1980 births
Living people
German male field hockey players
Olympic field hockey players of Germany
Olympic bronze medalists for Germany
Field hockey players at the 2004 Summer Olympics
People educated at Gordonstoun
Olympic medalists in field hockey
Medalists at the 2004 Summer Olympics
21st-century German people
2006 Men's Hockey World Cup players